Lost Speedways is a television documentary series produced by Peacock. The series is hosted by Dale Earnhardt Jr. as he travels to abandoned racetracks across the United States. Eight episodes were produced as part of the first season and were released on July 15, 2020. An eight-episode second season was released on July 1, 2021.

Episodes

Season 1 (2020)

Season 2 (2021)

References

External links
 

Peacock (streaming service) original programming
2020s American documentary television series
2020 American television series debuts
2021 American television series endings
English-language television shows
NASCAR on television
Documentary television series about sports